Avoniel Football Club is a former Irish football club based in east Belfast. It was founded in 1880 and was subsequently a founding member of the Irish Football Association. The club played in the early years of the Irish Cup. Its ground was Beechfield on the Mountpottinger Road in Belfast. It folded after a few years.

References

Association football clubs established in 1880
Defunct association football clubs in Northern Ireland
Association football clubs in Belfast
1880 establishments in Ireland
Founding members of the Irish Football Association